Nicomachus (fl. c. 375 BC) was the father of Aristotle.

The Suda states that he was a doctor descended from Nicomachus, son of Machaon the son of Asclepius. Greenhill notes he had another son named Arimnestus, and a daughter named Arimneste, by his wife Phaestis, or Phaestias, who was descended from Asclepius as well. He was a native of Stageira, and the friend and physician of Amyntas III, king of Macedonia, 393–369 BC. The work Nicomachean Ethics, Aristotle's work on Ethics may have been dedicated to his father.

Aristotle's son was also called Nicomachus.

Notes

4th-century BC Greek physicians
Ancient Stagirites
Aristotle
Old Macedonian kingdom